The 2021 UCLA Bruins football team represented the University of California, Los Angeles during the 2021 NCAA Division I FBS football season. The team was led by fourth-year head coach Chip Kelly and competed as members of the South Division in the Pac-12 Conference. Entering this season, Nike became the new apparel sponsor for the team, replacing former supplier Under Armour, and the Bruins' football uniforms bore the Jordan Brand.

In August, UCLA announced that digital tickets would replace printed tickets for entry to all games at the Rose Bowl.

The Bruins finished their regular season with an 8–4 overall record, and accepted a bid to the Holiday Bowl, where they were due to face North Carolina State. However, just hours before game time, the Bruins withdrew from the bowl due to COVID-19 protocols in their program, and the bowl was canceled.

Overall, the Bruins outscored their opponents by a combined total of 438 to 321 for the season.

Previous season
The previous year, the Bruins finished 3–4 in a shortened season. However, those four losses came by a total of only 15 points, including a one-point loss to Stanford in double overtime, 48–47, in the season finale.

Offseason

Incoming transfers
The Bruins added 8 players via transfer during the offseason:

 LB Devin Aupiu – Notre Dame
 WR Kam Brown – Texas A&M
 RB Zach Charbonnet – Michigan
 QB Ethan Garbers – Washington
 LB Jordan Genmark Heath – Notre Dame (graduate)
 DB Cameron Johnson – North Texas (graduate)
 LB Ale Kaho – Alabama
 DL Jay Toia – USC

Preseason

Arthur Ashe Jr. Sports Scholars
 Shea Pitts

Preseason award watchlists
 Greg Dulcich (Lombardi Award, John Mackey Award)
 Quentin Lake (Lott IMPACT Trophy)
 Kyle Philips (Paul Hornung Award)
 Dorian Thompson-Robinson (Davey O'Brien Award, Maxwell Award, Johnny Unitas Golden Arm Award)

Preseason All-Pac-12 team

 Kyle Philips (WR), First Team
 Greg Dulcich (TE), First Team
 Sean Rhyan (OL), First Team
 Dorian Thompson-Robinson (QB), Honorable Mention
 Brittain Brown (RB), Honorable Mention
 Sam Marrazzo (OL), Honorable Mention
 Otito Ogbonnia (DL), Honorable Mention
 Caleb Johnson (LB), Honorable Mention
 Qwuantrezz Knight (DB), Honorable Mention
 Quentin Lake (DB), Honorable Mention
 Stephen Blaylock (DB), Honorable Mention
 Nicholas Barr-Mira (PK), Honorable Mention

Personnel

Coaching staff

 Ikaika Malloe was hired on December 22 as analyst for UCLA through the Holiday Bowl, replacing Jason Kaufusi, who was hired away by Arizona. He will be a defensive assistant coach next season.
 Chad Kauha'aha'a was hired on December 24 as analyst for UCLA through the Holiday Bowl.

Roster

Schedule

Sources:

Game summaries

vs Hawaii

In his fourth season at UCLA, head coach Chip Kelly earned his first nonconference victory and first season-opening win with the Bruins after defeating Hawaii, 44–10. Prior to this, he had been 0–6 in nonconference games, including 0–4 against Group of Five schools, at UCLA. Running back Zach Charbonnet, a fresh transfer from Michigan, ran for 106 yards and three touchdowns in his UCLA debut. Charbonnet carried the ball six times and scored on runs of 21, 47 and again on 21 yards, helping the Bruins establish a 31–3 lead early in the second quarter. With the Bruins ahead by a wide margin, he did not carry the ball again in the game. Brittain Brown ran for 78 yards on 13 attempts, combining with Charbonnet to run for 184 yards and four touchdowns.

The Bruins built a 44–3 lead early in the second half before sending in the reserves. In all, UCLA's defense held Hawaii to 269 total yards and without a touchdown until late in the third quarter. Bruins linebacker Ale Kaho blocked a punt and teammate David Priebe recovered the ball in the endzone for a touchdown, which also ended the Rainbow Warriors’ streak of 154 game without a blocked punt, which had been the longest in the country. Dorian Thompson-Robinson was 10-of-20 passing for 130 yards and did not commit a turnover for the Bruins.

The game was played before an announced crowd of 32,982, the second-smallest ever at a UCLA home game at the Rose Bowl, ahead of only the 32,513 for an Oregon State game in November 1992.

vs No. 16 LSU

{{Americanfootballbox
|bg=#fff
|bg2=#eee
|titlestyle=; ;text-align:center;
|state=collapsed

|title= No. 16 LSU Tigers vs UCLA Bruins – Game summary
|date=September 4, 2021
|time=5:30 P.M PDT

|road=No. 16 Tigers
|R1=0|R2=10|R3=10|R4=7
|home=Bruins
|H1=0|H2=14|H3=10|H4=14

|stadium=Rose Bowl, Pasadena, CA
|attendance=68,123
|weather= Clear
|referee= David Smith
|TV= FOX
|TVAnnouncers= Joe Davis (play-by-play), Brock Huard (analyst), and Bruce Feldman (sideline)
|reference= Game Book

|scoring=
First Quarter
 No scoring.

Second Quarter
LSU – Kayshon Boutte 3-yard pass from Max Johnson (Cade York kick), 12:34.  LSU 7–0. Drive: 8 plays, 63 yards, 2:36.
UCLA – Greg Dulcich 75-yard pass from Dorian Thompson-Robinson (Nicholas Barr-Mira kick), 12:20. Tie 7–7. Drive: 1 play, 75 yards, 0:14.
UCLA – Zach Charbonnet 12-yard run (Nicholas Barr-Mira kick), 09:49. UCLA 14–7. Drive: 6 plays, 71 yards, 1:31.
LSU – Cade York 26-yard field goal, 03:53. UCLA 14–10. Drive: 5 plays, 26 yards, 0:51.

Third Quarter
UCLA –	Chase Cota 14-yard pass from Dorian Thompson-Robinson (Nicholas Barr-Mira kick), 10:52. UCLA 21–10. Drive: 3 plays, 17 yards, 0:43.	
LSU – Kayshon Boutte 44-yard pass from Max Johnson (Cade York kick), 08:56. UCLA 21–17. Drive: 4 plays, 75 yards, 1:56.
UCLA –	Nicholas Barr-Mira 43-yard field goal, 06:38. UCLA 24–17. Drive: 6 plays, 50 yards, 2:18.
LSU – Cade York 33-yard field goal, 01:07. UCLA 24–20. Drive: 12 plays, 60 yards, 5:31.

Fourth Quarter
UCLA –	Brittain Brown	1-yard rush (Nicholas Barr-Mira kick), 12:28. UCLA 31–20. Drive: 8 plays, 73 yards, 3:31.UCLA –	Kyle Philips 45-yard pass from Dorian Thompson-Robinson (Nicholas Barr-Mira kick), 06:31. UCLA 38–20. Drive: 8 plays, 81 yards, 4:34.LSU – 	Kayshon Boutte 45-yard pass from Max Johnson (Cade York kick),  04:08. UCLA 38–27. Drive: 7 plays, 73 yards, 2:23.	
|stats=
Top passers
LSU – Max Johnson – 26/36, 330 yards, 3 TD, INT
UCLA –	Dorian Thompson-Robinson – 9/16, 260 yards, 3 TD, INT	

Top rushers
LSU – Tyrion Davis-Price – 13 rushes, 30 yards
UCLA –	Zach Charbonnet – 11 rushes, 117 yards, TD

Top receivers
LSU – Kayshon Boutte – 9 receptions, 148 yards, 3 TD
UCLA – Greg Dulcich – 3 receptions, 117 yards, TD
}}

In a prime-time nationally televised game, the Bruins defeated the No. 16 LSU Tigers, 38–27. It was the first time since 2017 that UCLA began the season 2–0. Thompson-Robinson completed 9 of 16 passes for 260 yards, three touchdowns and an interception. Charbonnet had his second consecutive 100-yard game, finishing with 11 rushes for 117 yards and a touchdown. Brown also ran for 96 yards on 17 attempts and a fourth-quarter score.

UCLA evened the score 7–7 in the first quarter after Thompson-Robinson threw a 75-yard touchdown pass to tight end Greg Dulcich, who had three catches for 117 yards in the game. The Bruins took the lead for good on a 12-yard touchdown run by Charbonnet with 9:49 left in the second quarter. In the third quarter,  UCLA's Caleb Johnson intercepted LSU's Max Johnson and returned it 34 yards to the Tigers' 17. The Bruins scored in three plays on a Thompson-Robinson 12-yard pass to Chase Cota for a 21–10 lead. Midway into the fourth quarter, Thompson-Robinson threw a 45-yard touchdown pass to Kyle Philips to make it 38–20, virtually sealing the game.

The Bruins held the Tigers to 48 yards rushing on 1.9 yards per carry. Johnson was 26 of 46 passing for 330 yards with three touchdowns and one interception while being pressured into mistakes by the UCLA defense. The win over LSU was the first time in 13 years that a Pac-12 team beat a ranked opponent from the Southeastern Conference since the Bruins defeated Tennessee in 2008. The Rose Bowl attendance of 68,123 more than doubled the crowd from the previous week in the season opener. The win pushed UCLA into the national rankings at No. 16 in both the Associated Press and the Coaches Poll. It was the first time the Bruins were ranked since 2017.

vs Fresno State

Fresno State quarterback Jake Haener passed for 455 yards and threw the winning touchdown with 14 seconds left in the game to upset the Bruins 40–37. Limiping from an injured right hip, Haener led a six-play, 75-yard drive, culminating in a winning throw to Jalen Cropper for their fourth straight win over UCLA. The Bruins trailed 23–10 at halftime, but rallied in a game that had four lead changes in the final 7:27. UCLA went up 37–33 with 54 seconds left after Thompson-Robinson threw a 15-yard touchdown to Philips.

Fresno State focused on stopping UCLA's running game, holding Bruins' running backs Charbonnet and Brown to a 42 combined yards rushing on 2.8 yards per carry. UCLA's offense was limited to 16 plays in the first half, while Haener completed 21 passes by halftime. Down 26–17 in the fourth quarter, the Bruins came back after forcing two fumbles in a -minute span in the middle of the quarter, converting both into touchdowns for a 30–26 lead. The Bulldogs regained the lead after Haener's 19-yard touchdown pass to Erik Brooks put them ahead 33–30 with 2:55 remaining. After the play, Haener was on the ground, grimacing in pain, after suffering numerous hits in the contest.

Thompson-Robinson threw for 278 yards and three touchdowns, and he also led UCLA with 67 yards rushing on 13 carries. The Bulldogs' attention to the run opened up one-on-one coverage in their pass defense, contributing to Philips' seven receptions for 113 yards and two touchdowns. Fellow receiver Kam Brown finished with five catches for 111 yards and a touchdown. Charbonnet ran for two touchdowns. On defense, the Bruins surrendered 569 total yards and 32 first downs. Haener finished 38-of-53 passing and threw two touchdowns. Cropper had 14 catches for 141 yards and teammate Josh Kelly added eight receptions for 120 yards. Ronnie Rivers ran for 136 yards and two touchdowns.

at Stanford

Thompson-Robinson threw two touchdowns in the fourth quarter to lead UCLA to a 35–24 road win over Stanford. Ten seconds after the Cardinal tied the game at 21, he threw a tie-breaking 75-yard score to Philips. Thompson-Robinson later left the game due to a shoulder injury, but returned on the next play to throw a five-yard touchdown to Philips, sealing the outcome with 2:35 remaining in the game. Thompson-Robinson also ran for two touchdowns in the contest.

Stanford won the coin toss and elected to receive the opening kickoff. However, they began the game with five consecutive three-and-out drives, finally producing a first down on their sixth drive in the middle of the second quarter. Philips had a 59-yard punt return in the first quarter to set up a one-yard touchdown run by Thompson-Robinson. The Bruins went up 14–0 on a short running score by Charbonnet. Cardinal quarterback Tanner McKee began finding his receivers, throwing a 19-yard touchdown to Elijah Higgins in the second quarter. Thompson-Robinson put UCLA up by 14 again with another touchdown run late in the quarter. McKee hooked up with Higgins on a 56-yard touchdown pass in the third quarter, and Stanford tied the game early in the fourth quarter after McKee connected with Bryce Farrell on 52-yard touchdown.

Thompson-Robinson completed 18 of his 29 passes for 251 yards. Charbonnet had 118 yards rushing, and Brittain Brown added 66. UCLA's defense held Stanford to 67 yards rushing on 22 carries for an average of three yards per carry. The win was the Bruins' second in the last 14 meetings against the Cardinal.

vs Arizona State

UCLA lost 42–23 to Arizona State, as both teams vied for a 2–0 conference record and sole possession of first place in the Pac-12 South. The Bruins were down 32–23 early in the fourth quarter when Thompson-Robinson was stopped for a one-yard loss on fourth and one from the Sun Devils' two-yard line. Arizona State followed with an 11-play, 96-yard touchdown drive that took 6:52. UCLA committed 64 of their 89 penalty yards in the second half, and they were shutout in the second half for the first time since 2019 against Utah.

In the first quarter, the teams limited each other to a field goal before a high-scoring second quarter. After Sun Devils quarterback Jayden Daniels threw a 65-yard touchdown pass to Ricky Pearsall, the two reconnected on their following for a 54-yard score, giving Arizona State their first lead of the game with 2:44 remaining in the half. The Sun Devils fumbled a punt return before the half ended, which the Bruins recovered, allowing Nicholas Barr-Mira to kick a field goal as time expired. Early in the third quarter, Arizona State extended its lead to 32–23 on a 49-yard touchdown run by Rachaad White and a two-point conversion. UCLA was scoreless on its last five possessions of the game after scoring on five of seven to start the game.

Thompson-Robinson passed for 235 yards and ran for 93 in the game. Dulcich had a career-high nine catches for 136 yards, and Charbonnet carried 21 times for 89 yards. After the Sun Devils relied on its running game in their first four contests, Daniels threw for a season-high 286 yards. He had four passes that went for 47 yards or more against a Bruins defense that was last among Power Five schools with nine passes allowed of forty yards or more. UCLA played most of the game without injured safeties Quentin Lake and Kenny Churchwell III, which forced walk-on Alex Johnson into action. Bruins coach Kelly credited the Sun Devils for taking advantage of their depth issues at safety. Arizona State gained 458 total yards on offense, averaging nine yards per play, despite running only 51 plays to UCLA's 83 and the Bruins controlling the time of possession, 34:42 to 25:18.

at Arizona

Brown ran for a 48-yard touchdown in the fourth quarter to seal a victory over Arizona in a 34–16 win by UCLA. Charbonnet added 117 yards rushing, as the Bruins ran for 329 yard in the game on seven yards per carry. Thompson-Robinson accounted for three touchdowns, but his throws were inconsistent, totalling just 82 yards passing. The Wildcats' extended their losing streak to a school-record 17.

UCLA ran for 165 yards in the first half, and Thompson-Robinson had a three-yard scoring pass to Dulcich in the first quarter and ran for a two-yard touchdown in the second. The Bruins led 14–13 at halftime, but their quarterback had completed just one of his eight passes for three yards. Arizona settled for two field goals after drives that reached the UCLA 9- and 20-yard lines stalled. Up 24–16 late in the third quarter, the Bruins seemed to be taking control with the ball deep in Wildcats' territory. Brown ran for 11 yards on third and six but fumbled on the Arizona 18. UCLA's defense forced a turnover, and Brown atoned for his fumble with a score on his next run.

Brown and Charbonnet became the first pair of Bruins to rush for a 100 yards in the same game since Paul Perkins and Brett Hundley in 2014 against Colorado. UCLA had their most rushing yards since totalling 345 in 2013 in their season opener against Nevada. Thompson-Robinson completed eight of 19 passes in the game for one touchdown and one interception, while running for 28 yards and two touchdowns. After saying earlier in the week that he was "not really even close to 100%", he said his struggles were not related to injury, and Kelly credited the Wildcats' defense. Offensively, Arizona scored just one touchdown in six possessions in Bruins' territory, including three in the red zone.

at Washington

Thompson-Robinson had three touchdowns and freshman cornerback Devin Kirkwood had an interception late in the game to beat Washington, 24–17. Thompson-Robinson connected with Dulcich for a go-ahead, nine-yard touchdown pass with 8:19 left in the game. Then with 4:50 remaining, Kirkwood recovered for his first career interception after the Huskies' Rome Odzune was open for a potential touchdown. Kirkwood bobbled the ball at first before pulling it away from the Washington receiver. The Bruins improved to 3–0 on the road, and won five games in a season for the first time under Kelly.

UCLA led 17–3 late in the first half after Thompson-Robinson scored on a one-yard run on fourth and goal. Washington pulled to within 17–10 on a 26-yard touchdown catch by Odzune with 52 seconds remaining in the half. The Huskies tied the game at 17 on a fourth-and-goal one-yard run by quarterback Dylan Morris in the second half. On the Bruins' winning drive, Thompson-Robinson was a perfect 8-for-8 passing for 47 yards and ran for 10 yards, including a fourth-and-1 conversion.

Thompson-Robinson completed 21 of 26 passes for 183 yards and two touchdowns and ran for 87 yards and another touchdown. Charbonnet ran for 131 yards. UCLA starting wide receiver Philips did not play for unspecified reasons. At the time, he had a team-high 24 catches for six touchdowns. Despite their rally, Washington had a season-low 267 yards on offense. The Bruins won at Washington for the first time since 2014.

vs No. 10 Oregon
 Homecoming Game

This matchup brought College GameDay to UCLA for the first time since 1998. Oregon was the opponent that time as well.

UCLA jumped out to an early 14–0 lead after a rushing touchdown from Brittain Brown and a receiving touchdown from Kazmeir Allen. On the Ducks next possession, Anthony Brown threw an interception but it was negated due to an offsides penalty on UCLA. Oregon then scored a few plays later to make the score 14–7. On the ensuing drive, UCLA drove down the field but came away with no points because of a missed field goal. Oregon took advantage and scored a touchdown to tie the score, 14-14. Right before the half, UCLA was able to sustain a drive and make a field goal giving them a 17–14 lead.

The second half started with Oregon driving down the field, and scoring a touchdown giving them their first lead of the game at 21–17. On UCLA's first possession of the second half, they were forced to punt but Oregon blocked it. There was targeting on the play originally against the Ducks but it was overturned after review. The Ducks, with great field position, took advantage and scored another touchdown giving them a 27–17 lead. The Ducks would score one more time to make it a 34–17 game.

UCLA started their comeback with a rushing touchdown by Dorian Thompson-Robinson, and then getting the ball back due to a turnover by Oregon QB Anthony Brown, UCLA would score again to make it 34-31. Oregon would drive down the field with less than 4 minutes in the clock, all but icing the game if they’re able to score a touchdown. Oregon’s Anthony Brown ends up forcing another interception, giving UCLA the ball and a chance to win the game. DTR would get hurt on this ensuing possession, forcing backup Ethan Garbers to be the hero for UCLA. He would convert two 4th down plays in a row. Both to Phillips, the third time he would throw a game losing interception. Icing the game and giving Oregon the road win.

at Utah

vs Colorado

at USC

UCLA dominated their rivalry game at crosstown foes Southern Cal, 62–33, en route to re-claiming the coveted Victory Bell trophy. In a high-scoring contest, the Bruin offense was sparked by a handful of explosive plays from running back-turned-receiver Kazmeir Allen, who, despite having just three catches on the day, accumulated 215 yards of total offense and scored three touchdowns. Allen hauled in touchdown receptions of 45 and 58 yards during the first half, as UCLA entered the break up 28–17.

Meanwhile, UCLA quarterback Dorian Thompson-Robinson recovered from a poor start–– his first two throws of the game were both interceptions–– and played exceptionally for most of the game, accounting for six total touchdowns (four in the air and two on the ground) and outdueling USC signal-caller Jaxson Dart. UCLA was also effective in the run game despite the absence of Brittain Brown. Tailback Zach Charbonnet rushed for a season-high 167 yards and added a score.

Later in the game, with the third quarter winding down and momentum swinging in favor of USC, who had just cut the deficit to 9 points, a pivotal moment occurred when Allen found paydirt for the third time, returning a USC kickoff 100 yards to the house. This restored UCLA's commanding lead, and the Bruins never looked back from there. Late in the fourth quarter, Thompson-Robinson added an 'exclamation point' when he hurdled over USC cornerback Isaac Taylor-Stuart near the goal-line to score his second rushing touchdown of the day, all but icing the game with the score at 55–33. The Bruins would go on to score one more touchdown before the game ended and hit the 60-point threshold in front of a mostly empty stadium.

This game marked UCLA's 33rd win over USC all-time, and their first win at the Coliseum since 2013. The total of 95 combined points were the most ever scored in a single game between the schools. UCLA's 62 points scored in the game were the most they had ever scored against their crosstown rivals in the history of the series, and it also represented the most points the Trojans had surrendered in a game since their 62–41 loss to Arizona State, in Lane Kiffin's final game before his firing, in 2013. It also marked the Bruins' largest margin of victory over the Trojans since 1954, when UCLA defeated them 34–0.

vs California

UCLA scored 32 straight points from the second to fourth quarters to win 42–14 over California. It was the third consecutive win for the Bruins, just the second such streak during Kelly's coaching tenure at UCLA.

Rankings

Players drafted into the NFL

StatisticsUpdated through October 27, 2021''

Awards and honors

 September 29, 2021 – Shea Pitts is a semifinalist for the 2021 William V. Campbell Trophy
 October 19, 2021 – The offensive line is named to the 2021 Joe Moore Award Midseason Honor Roll.
 October 22, 2021 – Former quarterback Cade McNown will be honored with the naming of Tunnel 8 at the Rose Bowl
 October 22, 2021 – Thompson-Robinson added to the midseason Manning Award List
 October 23, 2021 – UCLA hosted ESPN College Gameday for the first time ever on campus. It was the second time ever (previous time hosting was at the Rose Bowl in 1998).
 November 18, 2021 – Greg Dulcich, Quentin Lake and Jack Landherr IV named to the 2021-22 CoSIDA Academic All-District 8 Football Team (College Sports Information Directors of America)
 November 23, 2021 – Quentin Lake named the Lott IMPACT Trophy Player of the Week
 November 28, 2021 – Team Awards: Quentin Lake, the Bobby Field UCLA Captains Award; Obi Eboh,  the Ed "Coach K" Kezirian Award (academic and athletic balance); Zach Charbonnet, the Henry R. "Red" Sanders Award (most valuable player); Brittain Brown, the Kenneth S. Washington Award (outstanding senior of the year); Qwuantrezz Knight, the Jerry Long "Heart" Award; Paul Grattan, Jr., the Iron Bruin Award; Hudson Habermehl, the Jackie R. Robinson Academic Excellence Award (highest grade-point average (GPA))
 December 22, 2021 – Shea Pitts is a final-six candidates for the Pop Warner College Football Award
 April 13, 2022 –  Greg Dulcich, Ethan Fernea, Quentin Lake and Otito Ogbonnia were named to the Hampshire Honor Society of the National Football Foundation

PFF All-conference team

 Zach Charbonnet (RB), First Team
 Kyle Philips (WR/PR), Second Team
 Sean Rhyan (OL), Second Team
 Paul Grattan Jr. (OL), Second Team
 Otito Ogbonnia (DL), Second Team
 Jay Shaw (CB), Second Team
 Quentin Lake (DB), Second Team
 Kazmeir Allen (KR), Second Team
 Greg Dulcich (TE), Third Team
 Mitchell Agude (DL), Honorable Mention

Source:

2021 All-Pac-12 team

 Kyle Philips (WR) First Team, (RS) Second Team
 Greg Dulcich (TE) First Team
 Sean Rhyan (OL) First Team
 Dorian Thompson-Robinson (QB) Second Team
 Zach Charbonnet (RB) Second Team
 Quentin Lake (DB) Second Team
 Qwuantrezz Knight (DB) Second Team
 Mitchell Agude (DL) Second Team
 Brittain Brown (RB) Honorable Mention
 Paul Grattan (OL) Honorable Mention

Source:

AP All-Pac-12 Football Teams 
 Dorian Thompson-Robinson, and Greg Dulcich (first team); Kyle Philips, Sean Rhyan, Paul Grattan Jr., Jay Shaw and Quentin Lake (second team); Zach Charbonnet (newcomer of the year)

References

UCLA
UCLA Bruins football seasons
UCLA Bruins football